Abylopsis tetragona is a species of siphonophore in the family Abylidae.

Description / Behavior 
Abylopsis tetragona is a species of siphonophores in the family Abylidae. Abylopsis tetragona is a single-celled organism, which is primarily gelatinous and measures about 1 cm. This species has an anterior nectophore and a posterior nectophore three times as wide. Both facets are less regularly pentagonal. A. Tetragona has radial symmetry and has two basal teeth. This species has an exoskeleton of chitin and are almost entirely marine. The A. Tetragona has two body forms; a polyp and a medusa. All Hydrozoans have many cells that can form into two tissue types: Epidermis and gastrodermis.  Abylopsis Tetragona's common name is siphonophore and can be defined as eurythermal and euryhaline, meaning that they can endure a wide range of temperatures and salinities. Siphonophores, at first sight, can be thought to be a long mega-animal, as seen in the picture to the right. But looking at it more closely, this mega-organism is made up of individual organisms called zooids (attached polyps medusae). Each zooid has a different role within the colony. Abylopsis Tetragona lacks pneumatophore (float) and has a nectophore. This means that A. tetragona uses its swimming bells to help with the locomotion of the colony. Siphonophores can undergo bioluminescent structures, enabling them to lure their prey and have some defense mechanism against their predators.  This species attaches itself to shells, seaweed, and other surfaces at the bottom of the ocean.

Distribution 
Abylopsis tetragona can be found at depths between 0 to 200m deep from the tropical to temperate oceans. This species is abundant in the Atlantic, Pacific, Indian oceans, and the Mediterranean Sea. In the Atlantic Ocean and the Mediterranean sea, the Abylopsis tetragona is mainly found between the depths of 50 and 200m. This species lives in both coastal and open waters. This species can be found at depths of 100m at night through vertical migration.

Diet 
There are no studies on the species specifically. However, calycophoran siphonophores feed on plankton. They are known as voracious predators who primarily feed on fish larvae and herbivorous plankton. This species show selectivity in its eating habits. They digest their food in their simple gastrovascular cavity, which is lined with flagellated cells. These cells help circulate the food in the cavity.

Life stages 
This species was only recorded in the medusoid stage. However, more generally, calycophorae siphonophorae, the family of the Abylopsis tetragona,  start their life cycle as an egg that forms into protozoid. Then, the protozoid buds with other zooids and grows into a mature colony. After, the members of the colony liberate eggs and sperm, and this starts the cycle again.

Movement 
Abylopsis tetragona is known as ocean drifters, which means that they are unable to move on their own. This species also uses vertical migration to allow them to stay away from predators and feed. They go up to depths of 100m at night, while in the day, they can go down to depths of 200m. The gelatinous carnivores increased in the water column due to waters warming. They travel the depths of the waters by means of a gas-filled tissue.

Reproduction 
The main breeding period of this species is during the spring (April to June), despite their constant presence in the waters all year round. They reproduce asexually through a budding process, creating daughter polyps. This organism has minimal parental investment. The sperm and eggs that are released in the water are left to survive without parental assistance.

References 
2. Andersen V., J. Sardou (1992). The diel migrations and vertical distributions of zooplankton and micronekton in the Northwestcrn Mediterranean Sea. 1. Euphausiids, mysids, decapods and fishes. J. Plankton Res. 14, 1129-1554

Buecher, E., 1999. Appearance of Chelophyes appendiculata and Abylopsis tetragona (Cnidaria, Siphonophora) in the Bay of Villefranche, northwestern. Mediterranean. Journal of Sea Research 41, 295–307

Castelbon C. (1987). Les migrations nycthémérales du zooplancton. Déterminisme expérimental des réactions locomotrices. Thèse de Doctorat ès Sciences, Université Aix-Marseille II, 380 p.

Guerrero, E., Kienberger, K., Villaescusa, A. et al. First record of beaching events for a calycophoran siphonophore: Abylopsis tetragona (Otto, 1823) at the Strait of Gibraltar. Mar Biodiv 49, 1587–1593 (2019). https://doi.org/10.1007/s12526-018-0926-1

GREVE,W., 1977. Interspecific interaction: the analysis of complex structures in carnivorous zooplankton populations. Helgol. Wiss. Meeresunters., Vol. 30, pp. 83-91

Abylidae
Animals described in 1823